Joan Cooper (November 10, 1931 in Berkeley, California – September 20, 2014 in Seattle, Washington), known by her pen name, J. California Cooper, was an American playwright and author. She wrote 17 plays and was named Black Playwright of the Year in 1978 for her play Strangers.

Life and career
Cooper took inspiration from Thomas Lanier Williams’s adopted name “Tennessee" and adopted "California" as part of her pen name.

Her work was encouraged by the author and activist Alice Walker, who has said of Cooper:

Cooper was named Black Playwright of the Year in San Francisco in 1978 for her play Strangers.

It was at the encouragement of Walker that Cooper turned from her claim to fame in the theater and started writing short stories. Her first collection A Piece of Mine was published in 1984 by Wild Trees Press, the publishing company founded by Walker. Two other story collections followed, before the release of her first novel, Family, in 1991. Cooper wrote Funny Valentines, which later was turned into a 1999 TV movie starring Alfre Woodard and Loretta Devine.

Awards Cooper won include the American Book Award (for her 1986 short-story collection Homemade Love), a James Baldwin Writing Award and a Literary Lion Award from the American Library Association.

She died in Seattle, Washington, in 2014 at the age of 82.

Bibliography
 1984: A Piece of Mine
 1986: Homemade Love, 1989 American Book Award winner
 1987: Some Soul to Keep
 1991: Family
 1991: The Matter Is Life
 1994: In Search of Satisfaction
 1996: Some Love, Some Pain, Some Time: Stories
 1998: The Wake of the Wind
 2001: The Future Has a Past
 2003: Age Ain't Nothing but a Number: Black Women Explore Midlife (contributor), edited by Carleen Brice
 2004: Some People, Some Other Place
 2006: Wild Stars Seeking Midnight Suns: Stories
 2009: Life is Short but Wide

See also

 History of African Americans in Texas

References

External links
 J. California Cooper at African American Literature Book Club
 J. California Cooper at Answers.com

1931 births
2014 deaths
20th-century American novelists
21st-century American novelists
American women novelists
African-American novelists
Writers from Berkeley, California
American women dramatists and playwrights
20th-century American women writers
21st-century American women writers
20th-century American dramatists and playwrights
American Book Award winners
20th-century African-American women writers
20th-century African-American writers
21st-century African-American women writers
21st-century African-American writers